The Boston Vegetarian Society (BVS) is a non-profit educational organization based in Boston, Massachusetts, USA, with the purpose of promoting and supporting vegetarianism and veganism. It hosts monthly speaking events and an annual vegetarian food festival in the fall.

History and purpose 
The Boston Vegetarian Society began in 1986. The first activities were centered around holding vegan potlucks in a church basement during the late 1980s. The Society has seen a steady rise in membership and attendance ever since. In 1998, it was incorporated in Massachusetts as an educational non-profit. In July 1998, it was granted 501(c)(3) tax-exempt status by the IRS.

The BVS provides info on events and related organizations, hosts the annual Boston Vegetarian Food Festival (BVFF), holds cooking classes, and promotes vegetarianism through mass transit advertising, outreach at fairs and festivals, and monthly free educational seminars. Their New Year's banquet and vegan cooking classes were reported to be particularly popular. BVS provides education, encouragement, and community support for vegetarians. The BVS also participates in the annual Earth Day Festival of Boston University.

Boston Vegetarian Food Festival

Since 1996, the Boston Vegetarian Society has annually hosted the Boston Vegetarian Food Festival (BVFF) in October or November.

It was first held on May 5, 1996, at MIT's Howard W. Johnson Athletics Center and was hosted by the MIT Vegetarian Support Group (VSG) ( renamed MIT Vegetarian Group) and the Vegetarian Resource Group. Notable speakers included Dr. Charles R. Attwood. In addition, in October of that year, they held a World Vegetarian Day celebration outdoors on the Boston Common. This is believed by North American vegetarians to be the first modern vegetarian food festival held in the United States, although the Toronto Vegetarian Food Fair had been held annually since 1985.

The second BVFF was held at Bunker Hill Community College on October 26, 1997. This combined as one event their indoor vegetarian food festival and the sense of the World Vegetarian Day event, since the combined event would be perpetually held around October or November.

Starting with the third annual festival on October 3, 1998, the BVFF has been held at the Reggie Lewis Track and Athletic Center in the Roxbury Crossing section of Boston, across the street from Roxbury Community College. Over the years, attendance grew so much that the festival was expanded from one day to two days in 2009; for the 2016 festival, organizers expected an attendance between 15,000 and 20,000. Each year's roster of speakers is almost entirely new; Dr. Michael Greger has been the only speaker who returns nearly each year, typically on or around his birthday.

Several different branding logos have been used since 1996 for subway, bus, newspaper, and other advertising; the current committee is seeking a single brand for the increasingly popular event.  The winning logos used on each year's festival's merchandise have emerged variably from college students and professional graphic artists.

See also 

 List of vegetarian festivals
 List of vegetarian organizations
 Mission Hill, Boston
 North American Vegetarian Society

References

External links

 

Non-profit organizations based in Massachusetts
Vegetarian organizations
Clubs and societies in Boston
Vegetarianism in the United States